Bir is a village and a Gram Panchayat Near Mundi City of Khandwa district in the Indian state of Madhya Pradesh.

References

Villages in Khandwa district